Pi Eridani, Latinized from π Eridani, is a star in the constellation Eridanus. It has an apparent visual magnitude of 4.40, which is bright enough to be seen on a dark, clear night. Based upon parallax measurements, it is located roughly 480 light years from the Sun.

This is an evolved red giant star with a stellar classification of M1 III, and is currently on the asymptotic giant branch. It is a slow irregular variable type LB that can increase in magnitude up to 4.38. At the estimated distance of Pi Eridani, this yields a physical size of about 77 times the radius of the Sun. It shines with 1,123 times the luminosity of the Sun from an outer atmosphere at an effective temperature of 3,841 K.

References

M-type giants
Asymptotic-giant-branch stars
Slow irregular variables
Eridanus (constellation)
Eridani, Pi
Durchmusterung objects
Eridani, 26
023614
017593
1162